Kahatchee, also known as Handytown, Achates, Cohatchie, or Keyhatchie, is an unincorporated community in Talladega County, Alabama, United States.

History
The community's name comes from the same name of an Upper Creek town which was located here. It also lends its name to nearby Kahatchee Creek and the Kahatchie Hills. In Creek, Kahatchie means "cane creek", in reference to the river cane which grows along waterways throughout Alabama. A post office called Handytown was established in 1873, and remained in operation until it was discontinued in 1874. A post office was then operated in the area under the name Achates from 1882 until it was closed in 1894.

References

Unincorporated communities in Talladega County, Alabama
Unincorporated communities in Alabama
Alabama placenames of Native American origin